Streptomyces actuosus is a bacterium species from the genus of  Streptomyces. Streptomyces actuosus produces nosiheptide and staurosporin.

See also 
 List of Streptomyces species

References

Further reading 
 
 
 
 
 
 

actuosus